Autochton is a genus of skipper butterflies. They belong to the subfamily Eudaminae, which was long included with the spread-winged skippers (Pyrginae) as a tribe. They are found from Mexico to South America.

Species 
The following species are recognised in the genus Autochton:
 Autochton sulfureolus (Mabille, 1883)
 Autochton reflexus (Mabille & Boullet, 1912)
 Autochton neis (Geyer, 1832)
 Autochton integrifascia (Mabille, 1891)
 Autochton itylus Hübner, [1823]
 Autochton bipunctatus (Gmelin, [1790]) – two-spotted banded-skipper or twin-spot banded skipper
 Autochton potrillo (Lucas, 1857)
 Autochton oryx (C. Felder & R. Felder, 1862)

References

External links 
Images representing Autochton at 
Natural History Museum Lepidoptera genus database

 
Eudaminae
Hesperiidae of South America
Hesperiidae genera
Taxa named by Jacob Hübner